Horacio Zeballos was the defending champion; however, he chose to compete in Rome instead.Go Soeda won in the final 7–6(5), 6–2 against Ryler DeHeart.

Seeds

Draw

Finals

Top half

Bottom half

References
Main Draw
Qualifying Draw

Manta Open - Singles
Manta Open